Catawissa is a small unincorporated community in Franklin County, Missouri, United States, on the St. Louis & San Francisco Railroad, 39 miles from St. Louis and four miles south-southeast of Pacific. It is located at the junction of Route N and Route O, southwest of Pacific. Winch Creek flows past the eastern margin of the community.

Catawissa was laid out in 1858, and most likely was named after Catawissa, Pennsylvania.  A post office called Catawissa has been in operation since 1860.

References

External links 
 History of St. James Catholic Church in Catawissa
 Directory of Cities, Towns, and Villages Past and Present in Missouri
 Collection of Photos of St Louis San Francisco Railroad Depots

Unincorporated communities in Franklin County, Missouri
Unincorporated communities in Missouri
1858 establishments in Missouri
Populated places established in 1858